Barak Moshe (born 19 March 1991) is an Israeli footballer.

Career

In 2009, Moshe represented Israel at the 2009 Maccabiah Games, winning a bronze medal.

Barak Moshe was selected to be the captain of the national team from U16 all the way to U19. 
Barak won the MVP trophy of the winter tournament for national teams U19, which pathed his way to his first professional contract with Beitar Jerusalem that signed him for five years. Soon after, Barak had his debut when he was only 17 years old. On this year, his team won the Israeli Cup winning FC Maccabi Haifa 2-1 but Barak was unfortunate to get injured just a few days before the match. 
In 2015 Barak retired from soccer.

Honors

- Captain of the Israeli Soccer National Team U16, U17, U18, U19, U20

- Professional Soccer Career Beitar Jerusalem FC 2008 - 2014

- Israeli State Cup Runner up 2008 U19 2009/2010

- MVP of International Winter Tournament U19 2009

- Bronze medal representing Israel in Maccabiah Games 2009

- Israeli Toto Cup Winner "Ligat AL" 2009/2010

References
 

1991 births
Living people
Competitors at the 2009 Maccabiah Games
Israeli Jews
Israeli footballers
Beitar Jerusalem F.C. players
Hapoel Jerusalem F.C. players
Israeli Premier League players
Liga Leumit players
Maccabiah Games medalists in football
Maccabiah Games bronze medalists for Israel
Footballers from Jerusalem
Association football midfielders